Alexander Makarov (born September 28, 1989) is a Russian professional ice hockey defenceman playing with HC Yugra of the Kontinental Hockey League (KHL).

Makarov made his Kontinental Hockey League debut with HC Vityaz during the inaugural 2008–09 KHL season.

References

External links

1989 births
Living people
Metallurg Novokuznetsk players
Russian ice hockey defencemen
Torpedo Nizhny Novgorod players
HC Vityaz players
HC Yugra players